The 2015 X-League Indoor Football season was the second season for the X-League. The biggest change in the off-season is the addition of the Cape Fear Heroes, Corpus Christi Fury, Florida Tarpons, Rio Grande Valley Sol, Marion Blue Racers, and Bloomington Edge.

Standings

 z-Indicates best regular season record
 x-Indicates clinched playoff berth

Playoffs
Originally planned as a three-team playoff, the X-Bowl was moved up to June 6, 2015, and the post-season shortened after the Cape Fear Heroes were suspended by the league and the St. Louis Attack agreed to forgo their third-place playoff berth.

References

External links
 2015 XLIF Schedule